Deh Jani (also Romanized as Deh Jānī and Dejānī) is a village in Borborud-e Gharbi Rural District, in the Central District of Aligudarz County, Lorestan Province, Iran. At the 2006 census, its population was 79, in 12 families.

References 

Towns and villages in Aligudarz County